Pheri Bhetaula (English: See you again) is a 1989 Nepali romantic film. The cast includes the debutant Manisha Koirala and Prakash Adhikari. The music of this movie was composed by Ranjit Gazmer. This was the Nepali film that Manisha again never appeared, until her marriage in 2010 and return back to her country film industry for almost 2 decades later.

Cast
 Manisha Koirala 
 Mohan Niraula, 
 Sabita Shahi, 
 Prakash Adhikari, 
 Ratan Thapa, 
 Pragya Ratna Bajracharya,
 Parvati Adhikari, 
 Ravi Shah, 
 Kuldip Serchan, 
 Laxmi Giri
Manoj Gurung (main child actor)

Soundtrack

External links
 http://www.newsofnepal.com/kamana/kamana249/manisha.htm 
 https://www.imdb.com/name/nm0463539/bio

1989 films
Nepalese romantic drama films
Nepali-language films